Bragg House may refer to:

in the United States
(by state)
Bragg-Mitchell House, Mobile, AL, listed on the NRHP in Alabama
Bragg Guesthouse, Little Rock, AR, listed on the NRHP in Arkansas
Bragg House (Camden, Arkansas), listed on the NRHP in Arkansas
Bragg's Pies Building, Phoenix, AZ, listed on the NRHP in Arizona
Bragg, Caleb, Estate, Montauk, NY, listed on the NRHP in New York
Amis-Bragg House, Jackson, NC, listed on the NRHP in North Carolina